Keyuan station can refer to:
Keyuan station (Chengdu Metro), a metro station in Chengdu, China
Keyuan station (Shenzhen Metro), a metro station in Shenzhen, China